Irina Buryachok and Valeria Solovyeva were the defending champions, but Solovyeva decided not to participate.
Buryachok successfully defended the title alongside Oksana Kalashnikova, defeating Eleni Daniilidou and Aleksandra Krunić in the final, 4–6, 7–6(7–3), [10–4].

Seeds

Draw

Draw

References
 Main Draw

Baku Cup - Doubles
2013 Doubles